This is a list of rulers and office-holders of Kenya.

Heads of state 
Heads of State of Kenya

Heads of government 
Heads of Government of Kenya

Colonial governors 
Governors-General of Kenya
Colonial Heads of Kenya
Colonial Heads of Mombasa

Heads of former states 
Rulers of the Masai
Rulers of the Nandi
Rulers of Pate
Rulers of Wanga
Rulers of Wituland

See also 
Lists of office-holders